The Rely on Your Beliefs Fund (ROYB Fund) is an American Political Action Committee associated with Rep. Roy Blunt. Since its inception, the fund has collected and spent more than $1.8 million.

On May 23, 2002, the ROYB Fund was forced to enter into a consent decree with the Missouri Ethics Commission for failing to comply with Missouri law by not filing a statement of organization and required reports in a timely fashion.

People
 Roy Blunt – honorary chairman. 
 Jim Ellis – founding staffer

Notable contributors
 AbbVie
 American Airlines
 American Beverage Association
 American Crystal Sugar Company
 American Dental Association
 Amgen 
 Anheuser-Busch
 Anthem Insurance
 AT&T
 Enron 
 Facebook
 Koch Industries
 Merck
 Microsoft PAC 
 National Association of Broadcasters
 Pfizer
 Travellers 
 Time-Warner
 T-Mobile
 Waste Management
 Walmart
 In March 2002, the Tigua tribe began making political contributions on request of Jack Abramoff in hopes of getting a casino approved.

Payees
 J.W. Ellis Co. (roughly $88,000 in consulting fees)

References

 fund's site
 Pro Publica's page on the fund
 Federal Election Commission documents
 Open Secrets page on the fund
 Washington Post article

United States political action committees